Isaacs Creek may refer to:

Isaacs Creek (Missouri)
Isaacs Creek (Virginia)